iCAM, short for image color appearance model, is developed by Mark D. Fairchild and Garrett M. Johnson and initially published in 2002 at the IS&T/SID 10th Color Imaging Conference in Scottsdale, Arizona. , the latest version appears to be iCAM06, a 2006 revision that expanded tone mapping capacities for HDR.

It has been recognized that there are significant aspects of color appearance phenomena that are not described well, if at all, by models such as CIECAM97s or CIECAM02.

The requirements for such a model include:
 Simple implementation for images
 Spatially localized adaptation and tone mapping for high-dynamic-range images
 Other spatial phenomena
 Accurate color appearance
 Scales for gamut mapping and other image editing procedures
 Spatial filtering for visibility of artifacts
 Color difference metrics for image quality assessment

As of 2013, iCAM06 is capable of reaching all of the goals above. Temporal effects have been noted as a future direction of development according to Fairchild's lecture slides.

Characteristics of iCAM 
iCAM can accurately predict the results of an observation under different conditions. It can describe the aspects of color appearance phenomena and metrics of color differences, and it is used to obtain color gamut mapping calculations based on the perception of the human eye. iCAM uses image's spatial aspects of vision and adapts stimulus to become a low-passing image.

References

External links 
 iCAM: An Image Appearance Model at the Munsell Color Science Laboratoryn Website
 The iCAM framework for image appearance, image differences, and image quality M.D. Fairchild and G.M. Johnson, Journal of Electronic Imaging (2004)
 Rendering HDR images G.M. Johnson and M.D. Fairchild, IS&T/SID 11th Color Imaging Conference (2003)
 Measuring images: Differences, Quality, and Appearance G.M. Johnson and M.D. Fairchild, SPIE/IS&T Electronic Imaging Conference (2003)
 Image appearance modeling M.D. Fairchild and G.M. Johnson, SPIE/IS&T Electronic Imaging Conference (2003)
 Meet iCAM: A Next-Generation Color Appearance Model M.D. Fairchild and G.M. Johnson, IS&T/SID 10th Color Imaging Conference (2002)

Color appearance models
Vision